Stephen, Steven or Steve Ford may refer to:

 Stephen Sean Ford (born 1989), American actor
 Steve Ford (footballer) (born 1959), English footballer
 Steve Ford (born 1965), Welsh rugby union player
 Steven Ford (born 1956), American actor

See also
Steven Forde